Maurice R. Bebb (1891–1986) (or M. R. Bebb as he signed his work) was a notable etcher and printmaker of the American Midwest, whose best-known subjects were birds native to Oklahoma and Minnesota, where he spent his time. Etching involves using copper plates on which an artist has etched or “bitten” his picture with acid. Color etchings like Bebb's require two to four copper plates, each is inked with one or more different colors and printed one over the other to produce the finished picture. Technically, the process is called multi-plate soft-ground and aquatint etching.

1891
Bebb was born in Chicago in 1891. Grandchild of Michael Schuck Bebb, noted Botanist, and great-grandson of William Bebb, former Governor of Ohio. He graduated from the University of Illinois in 1913 and moved to Muskogee, Oklahoma, where he lived the rest of his life. By profession, he was a florist and had no formal art training. He established a florist business in Muskogee and married his first wife, Helen. In his early 50s, he began to draw, and later wrote a friend that he had always been an artist but didn’t realize it until later in life. He studied original prints from other artists and read technical manuals, then began working on copper plates around 1943. At that time he befriended and received encouragement from Charles M. Capps, Arthur W. Hall, Leon R. Pescheret, F. Leslie Thompson and other well-established printmakers of the time, most of whom had formal training and had studied color etching in Europe or with master printmakers. Charles M. Capps was a charter member of the Prairie Print Makers, a group Bebb later joined.

1951–1954

In 1951, Bebb retired from his florist business to devote himself full-time to his art. He traveled to Europe twice, once for eight months and a second time for six months, and took advantage of the long-standing presence of printmakers in Europe to secure copper plates, inks and other supplies. 

Bebb’s first etchings were exhibited in 1949 and he enjoyed instant success. The following year, he received the Purchase Prize of the Graphic Chemical Company at the Chicago Annual Exhibition. The Print Makers Society of California selected his print Black Swans (1952) for their 1953 publication. His color etching of Yellow-Throated Warbler was chosen as the 44th presentation print and presented to associate members of the Chicago Society of Etchers in 1954. Then, in 1960, his print White-Breasted Nuthatch was selected for the thirtieth publication of the Prairie Print Makers. 

Nan Sheets, fellow artist and the first Oklahoman to be included in the annual publication of Who's Who in American Art, wrote, “In Mr. Bebb we have an artist of recognition who pays attention to true perspective, clarity of design, rhythm of modulated line, and who is an expert draftsman...The Bebb pencil drawings are not quickly executed sketches but carefully considered works, with proper consideration of pencil technique...He excels not only because he is able to draw, but because he has mastered the various methods employed in making etchings. The fact that he has artistic ability to portray what he sees, and as simply as possible, places him high among his fellow artists”.

2011
In January 2011, students at Sadler Arts Academy in Muskogee, OK received a grant from The Kennedy Center to make a short film about Bebb. Bebb created over 175 subjects and today his work can be found in several permanent collections including those of Cornell University and the University of Kansas.

References

External links 
 The dedicated Maurice R Bebb website
 The Kennedy Center On Location Showcase

1891 births
1986 deaths